Rhodes Park, also known as Rhodes Skatepark, is a  skatepark between 15th and 16th Streets under Interstate 184 in Boise, Idaho, USA. The park is managed by the Boise Parks and Recreation Department and includes skateboarding and parkour challenges.

History
The park opened in 1995 and was named for its original promoter and builder, Glenn Rhodes. In 2016 the park reopened after a renovation by Grindline Skateparks.

Rhodes Park has been featured by ESPN as a pre-qualifier venue for X Games.

In 2018 a skateboarder died from injuries from a fall at Rhodes Park. The cause of death was rhabdomyolysis, blood toxins resulting from muscle tissue deterioration after an injury.

See also
 List of parks in Boise

References

External links

Photographs from Northwestskater

Parks in Idaho
Boise, Idaho
Skateparks in the United States